The River Swilgate is a small river that flows through Gloucestershire, England.

Formed by the confluence at Elmstone Hardwicke of the Hyde Brook which flows westwards from Bishop's Cleeve, and Wymans Brook that flows north west through Cheltenham. The Swilgate flows north west and north to Tewkesbury where it joins the River Avon close to its confluence with the Severn.

The Swilgate gained some notoriety when the New Statesman's issue of 4 January 2013 stated: "The Swilgate, the tributary of the Avon that runs round the southern edge of the town, had overflown its banks four days earlier".

References

Rivers of Gloucestershire
1Swilgate